is a Japanese photographer.

References

1937 births
Living people
Japanese photographers
Place of birth missing (living people)
20th-century Japanese photographers